Soutpan is a town in Lejweleputswa District Municipality in the Free State province of South Africa.

Village 45 km west of Brandfort. Afrikaans for ‘salt pan or depression’, the name is derived from a large geographical feature of that type, on the slopes of which the Florisbad archaeological site is situated.

References

Populated places in the Masilonyana Local Municipality